Larry J. Tidemann (born April 13, 1948 in Sioux Falls, South Dakota) is a former American politician and a former Republican member of the South Dakota Senate representing District 7 from 2011-2019. Tidemann served consecutively in the South Dakota Legislature from January 2005 until January 11, 2011 in the South Dakota House of Representatives District 7 seat.

Education
Tidemann earned his BS and MS from the South Dakota State University.

Elections

State House of Representatives
2004 When House District 7 incumbent Republican Representative Orville Smidt ran for South Dakota Senate, Tidemann and incumbent Republican Representative Sean O'Brien were unopposed for the June 1, 2004 Republican Primary and won the four-way November 2, 2004 General election where Representative O'Brien took the first seat and Tidemann took the second seat with 4,696 votes (27.81%) ahead of Democratic nominees Roger Prunty and Rich Widman, who had run for the seat in 2000.
2006 When House District 7 incumbent Republican Representative O'Brien left the Legislature and left a District 7 seat open, Tidemann and Carol Pitts were unopposed for the June 6, 2006 Republican Primary and won the four-way November 7, 2006 General election where fellow Republican nominee Pitts took the first seat by 11 votes and Tidemann took the second seat with 4,585 votes (32.08%) ahead of Democratic nominees Robert Klein and Joshua Horton.

2008 Tidemann and incumbent Republican Representative Pitts were again unopposed for the June 3, 2008 Republican Primary, and won the four-way November 4, 2008 General election where Tidemann took the first seat with 5,428 votes (32.05%) and incumbent Representative Pitts took the second seat ahead of Democratic nominees Steve Binkley and Abigail Howell.
2010 To challenge Senate District 7 incumbent Democratic Senator Pam Merchant, Tidemann was unopposed for the June 8, 2010 Republican Primary and won the November 2, 2010 General election with 4,289 votes (54.15%) against Democratic Senator Merchant.

State Senate
2012 Tidemann and Democratic former Senator Pam Merchant were both unopposed for their June 5, 2012 primaries, setting up a rematch; Tidemann won the November 6, 2012 General election with 4,362 votes (53.52%) against Senator Merchant.

References

External links
Official page at the South Dakota Legislature

Larry Tidemann at Ballotpedia
Larry Tidemann at the National Institute on Money in State Politics

1948 births
Living people
Republican Party members of the South Dakota House of Representatives
Politicians from Sioux Falls, South Dakota
Republican Party South Dakota state senators
South Dakota State University alumni
People from Brookings, South Dakota
21st-century American politicians